Ogirala Ramachandra Rao (1905–1957) was an Indian actor, music director and multi instrumentalist, predominant in Telugu cinema.

Early life and career
Ogirala was born on 10 September 1905 at Vijayawada, Andhra Pradesh to Ogirala Janardhana Sharma and Subbamma. He started his career as an actor in Sri Venkateswara Mahatyam (1939), where he played the role of Lord Shiva. His debut as Music director was Malli Pelli in the same year produced by Y. V. Rao. He was also playback singer for Y.V.Rao and sang with Kanchanamala in the film.

He was also the music director for his next film Vishwamohini (1940). He has played key role for the success of Bejawada Rajaratnam as playback singer. He has assisted V. Nagayya for Swargaseema (1945) and Yogi Vemana (1947) for Vijaya Pictures.

Personal life
His son Ogirala Lakshmi Narasimha Murthy and daughter Machiraju Kalpakavalli are settled in Hyderabad, India. They used to sing in All India Radio Hyderabad and also in DD National Channel for Hyderabad in 1980's.

Filmography

External links
 

Telugu film score composers
1905 births
1957 deaths
Indian male composers
20th-century Indian composers
Film musicians from Andhra Pradesh
Musicians from Vijayawada
Male film score composers
20th-century male musicians